Nicholas Le Prevost (born 18 March 1947) is an English actor.

Early life
Le Prevost was born in Wiltshire.  He was educated at Shaftesbury Grammar School, Shaftesbury, Dorset from 1957 to 1961 and at Kingswood School, Bath from 1961 to 1964. At school, he studied Ecclesiastical Architecture, and has said that, had he not become an actor, he would have liked to be an architect. He trained at the Royal Academy of Dramatic Art.

Acting career
His TV and radio credits include Coronation Street, The Imitation Game, It Takes a Worried Man, The Jewel in the Crown, HR, Brideshead Revisited, The Camomile Lawn, Harnessing Peacocks, Babblewick Hall, The Ghosts of Motley Hall, Up the Garden Path, The War of the Worlds, Inspector Morse, Midsomer Murders, Foyle's War, Agatha Christie's Poirot, The Vicar of Dibley and A Man for All Seasons.

He was nominated for a 2002, Laurence Olivier Theatre Award for Best Performance in a Supporting Role in a Musical or Entertainment of 2001, for his performance in a West End production of My Fair Lady. Also in 2002, he appeared as Benedick in Gregory Doran's production of Much Ado About Nothing with the Royal Shakespeare Company, opposite Harriet Walter. In 2002, he did an interview where he talked about playing Benedick in Much Ado About Nothing.

Since 2003, Le Prevost has been portraying Georges Simenon's fictional detective Jules Maigret for BBC Radio, replacing the late Maurice Denham in the role. In 2005, he appeared as W. Somerset Maugham in a BBC Radio adaption of the author's novel  The Razor's Edge.

His film work includes Clockwise, The Girl in a Swing, and Shakespeare in Love. In 2009 he appeared on television in Margaret.

In July 2010, he appeared in a double bill of Tom Stoppard's The Real Inspector Hound and Richard Brinsley Sheridan's The Critic at the Minerva Theatre, Chichester.

In 2010, he appeared in ITV drama Wild at Heart as Gene.

From February 2015, he appeared in Man and Superman at the National Theatre, London.

Le Prevost is a director of The Wrestling School, a London theatre company specialising in the work of Howard Barker.

In 2015, he appeared as Count Fiskon in the BBC TV series Father Brown episode "The Lair of the Libertines". In 2016, he had a cameo role as an investment banker for a fictitious London-based firm called Waterston and Price in the Danish thriller Follow the Money, which was shown on BBC 4 in spring of that year.

Partial filmography

External links

References

1947 births
People from Wiltshire
Living people
English male stage actors
English male radio actors
English male television actors
Alumni of RADA